Kaneyadavara Bagge Prakatane is a 2022 Indian Kannada-language comedy-drama film directed by Anil Kumar. It stars Rangayana Raghu, P. Ravi Shankar, Tabla Nani, Chikkanna, Tilak Shekar, and Ashika Ranganath.

Cast
 Ashika Ranganath as Rashmika
 Tilak Shekar as Yashwant
 Rangayana Raghu as Rangappa
 Tabla Nani as Narayanappa
 Chikkanna as Chikku
 P. Ravishankar as Krishnamurthy

Soundtrack

References

2022 films
2022 comedy-drama films
Indian comedy-drama films
2020s Kannada-language films